The 1932 Women's Western Open was a golf competition held at Ozaukee Country Club, which was the third edition of the event. Jane Weiller won the championship in match play competition by defeating June Beebe in the final match, 5 and 4.

References

Women's Western Open
Golf in Wisconsin
Women's sports in Wisconsin
Women's Western Open
Women's Western Open
Women's Western Open